In the United Kingdom a lender can take possession of a person's home due to default on a mortgage. This process is incorrectly often known as "mortgage repossession"; however assets can only be "repossessed" if the lender was the seller, which is often the case with cars but not usually with houses. The correct terminology is "possession". The process typically involves obtaining firstly an order for possession in the courts, then an eviction warrant. The eviction is carried out by bailiffs. Once the lender has obtained possession, it can then sell the home to recoup any lost arrears.

Mortgage possession involves legal proceedings in which a mortgagee, or other lienholder, usually a lender, obtains a court order for possession of a property, prior to exercising the mortgagor's equitable right of redemption. Usually a lender obtains a security interest from a borrower who mortgages or pledges an asset like a house to secure the loan. If the borrower defaults the lender can possess the property.

Mortgage possession is not to be confused with foreclosure. In the United Kingdom foreclosure is a little used remedy which vests the property in the mortgagee with the mortgagor having no right to any surplus from the sale. Because this remedy can be harsh, courts almost never allow it. Instead, they will usually grant an order for possession and an order for sale, which mitigates some of the harshness of the repossession by allowing the sale.

Mortgagors can lose their properties by default on their lease; this could occur where there is unpaid ground rent or unpaid rent on a shared ownership property. In this circumstance the property (or rather the lease) would be subject to forfeiture. Typically a lender on these properties would pay the ground rent and add it to the mortgage debt to avoid losing its rights to the property.

External links 
  UK Citizens Advice Bureau 
  National Homelessness Advice Service
  Financial Ombudsman Service

Mortgage industry of the United Kingdom
Foreclosure